William T. "Pete" Ankney (born c. 1932) is a former American football coach. He served as the head football coach at the University of Dayton from 1963 to 1964, compiling a record of 4–14–2.  Before he was hired at Dayton in December 1962, Ankney coached high school football in the state of Ohio, at Fairmont High School in Kettering and Canton McKinley High School in Canton.

Ankney is the uncle of former Bowling Green State University head football coach Moe Ankney.

Head coaching record

College

References

Year of birth missing (living people)
1930s births
Living people
Dayton Flyers football coaches
High school football coaches in Ohio
University of Dayton alumni
Sportspeople from Dayton, Ohio